Nicolas Turquois (born 27 July 1972) is a French politician of the Democratic Movement (MoDem) who has been serving as a member of the French National Assembly since the 2017 elections, representing the department of Vienne.

A former farmer and deputy mayor of Ouzilly-Vignolles, Turquois resigned from his post in 2006 after a disagreement with the local president of the Loudun intermunicipal network, after which he joined the Union for French Democracy, which later became MoDem.

In March 2019, Turquois became a member of the French Commission on the Energy transition. Since 2020, he has been serving as his parliamentary group's co-rapporteur on the government's pension reform plans.

References

Living people
Deputies of the 15th National Assembly of the French Fifth Republic
Democratic Movement (France) politicians
1972 births